Pope Peter VII of Alexandria (Abba Boutros El-Gawly), 109th Pope of Alexandria & Patriarch of the See of St. Mark.  He was born in the village of El-Gawly in Upper Egypt, and known as Mankarius while a monk at the Monastery of Saint Anthony on the Red Sea.

During his papacy, sensing intimations of pressure from Roman Catholicism, the Coptic Church intensified her teaching, her preaching, and her pastoral work, and the Coptic Pope himself intensified his writing on matters of faith and doctrine. During the period, many private and public patriarchal libraries were founded.

When the Russian Tsar sent his delegates with an offer to put the Coptic Church under his protection, Pope Peter declined the proposal by asking, "Does your Emperor live forever?" When the envoy answered that he would die, like all humans, the Pope told him that he preferred the Protector of the Church who would not die.

The papal throne stood vacant for a little over one year before his successor, Cyril IV, was elected.

Also during the papacy, Saint Sidhom Bishay  was martyred at the hands of Muslims in Damietta. His martyrdom made possible the raising of the Cross openly during Christian funeral processions, for this practice was previously forbidden.

His feast date is 28 Paremhat.

Source and further details
 Coptic Orthodox Synaxarium (Book of Saints)

Specific

1852 deaths
Peter VII, Pope
Year of birth missing
People from Asyut Governorate